Islamzhan Kasymzhanovich Nasyrov (born 8 April 1998) is a Russian Kazakh football player who plays for FC Arsenal Tula. He plays as a left-back or a left midfielder.

Club career
He made his debut in the Russian Professional Football League for FC Nosta Novotroitsk on 27 September 2015 in a game against FC Neftekhimik Nizhnekamsk.

On 24 July 2019, he signed with Russian Premier League club FC Ural Yekaterinburg. He made his RPL debut for Ural on 17 August 2019 in a game against PFC Krylia Sovetov Samara, as a starter.

On 3 September 2021, he joined FC Tyumen on loan.

References

External links
 
 
 

1998 births
Russian people of Kazakhstani descent
People from Orenburg Oblast
Sportspeople from Orenburg Oblast
Living people
Russian footballers
Association football midfielders
FC Nosta Novotroitsk players
FC Ural Yekaterinburg players
FC Orenburg players
FC Tyumen players
FC Arsenal Tula players
Russian Premier League players
Russian First League players
Russian Second League players
Competitors at the 2019 Summer Universiade